The Air and Space Campaign Medal (ASCM) is an award of the United States Air Force and United States Space Force which was first created on April 24, 2002 by order of Secretary of the Air Force James G. Roche.  The ASCM may be awarded to members of the USAF and USSF who, after March 24, 1999, supported a significant U.S. military operation designated by the Chief of Staff of the United States Air Force as qualifying for the ASCM.

Eligibility
To be eligible for the Air and Space Campaign Medal a service member must perform direct support of a military operation for at least thirty consecutive days or for sixty non-consecutive days. "Direct support" is defined as deploying in support of an ASCM approved operation inside the geographic area of combat which historically were deployed forward. This includes, but is not limited to, sortie generation, intelligence, surveillance, targeting, etc. Squadron Commanders may determine other functions that meet the intent of this award.

Members who provided direct support for 30 consecutive or 60 nonconsecutive days to one of these operations inside of the geographic area of combat qualify for the ASCM.

The Air and Space Campaign Medal is only authorized for Air Force personnel and is prohibited for issuance if another campaign or service medal has already been received for the operation in question.  Additional awards are denoted by service stars.

Qualifying Operations
Operation Allied Force 24 March 1999 – 10 June 1999
Operation Joint Guardian 11 June 1999 – Date to be Determined (DTBD)
Operation Allied Harbour 4 April 1999 – 1 September 1999
Operation Sustain Hope/Shining Hope 4 April 1999 – 10 July 1999
Operation Noble Anvil 24 March 1999 – 20 July 1999
Kosovo Task Force Hawk 5 April 1999 – 24 June 1999
Kosovo Task Force Saber 31 March 1999 – 8 July 1999
Kosovo Task Force Falcon 11 June 1999 – DTBD
Kosovo Task Force Hunter 1 April 1999 – 1 November 1999
Operation Odyssey Dawn 26 February 2011 – 31 October 2011 
Operation Unified Protector 26 February 2011 – 31 October 2011

Operations related to the Global War on Terrorism (to include Operation Iraqi Freedom and Operation Enduring Freedom) are not eligible for the ASCM.

References

External links
Air and Space Campaign Medal

2002 establishments in the United States
Awards and decorations of the United States Air Force
Awards and decorations of the United States Space Force
Awards established in 2002